The Chapel of All Souls is a former Roman Catholic parish church under the authority of the Roman Catholic Archdiocese of New York, located in Shandelee, Livingston, Sullivan County, New York. It was established in 1912 and closed in 1970. It was formerly attached to St. Aloysius in Livingston Manor. The address is on Shandelee Road, Livingston Manor, New York 12758.

"St. Aloysius Church in Livingston Manor was built in 1896. the Sacred Heart Church in DeBruce was built in 1906, the All Souls Church in Shandelee was built in 1917."

References 

Christian organizations established in 1912
Religious organizations disestablished in 1970
Roman Catholic churches completed in 1917
Closed churches in the Roman Catholic Archdiocese of New York
Closed churches in New York (state)
Roman Catholic churches in New York (state)
Churches in Sullivan County, New York
1912 establishments in New York (state)
Roman Catholic chapels in the United States
20th-century Roman Catholic church buildings in the United States